The Stavropol Governorate was a Governorate (province) of the Russian Empire. It roughly corresponded to most of present-day Stavropol Krai. It was created in 1847 out of the territories of Caucasian peoples and disbanded in Russian SFSR in 1924.

Demographics
As of 1897, 873,301  people populated the oblast. Russians constituted the majority of the population. Significant minorities consisted of Ukrainians. Total Slavic population was  804,153 (92%)

Ethnic groups in 1897

References

Further reading
 

 
History of the North Caucasus
Governorates of the Russian Empire